Calcflinta, or calc-flinta, is a fine grained calc–silicate rock found amongst the metamorphic rocks of the eastern Highlands of Scotland. It is a hornfels developed from calcareous mudstone. Calcflinta is also found, for example, around the northwest margin of the Dartmoor granite in England, and on King Island in Tasmania.

References

Metamorphic rocks